Cascilla is an unincorporated community located in Tallahatchie County, Mississippi.

Although an unincorporated community, Cascilla has a post office and a zip code of 38920.

Jamie L. Whitten, the second-longest serving U.S. Representative and the fifth-longest serving member of the U.S. Congress, was born in Cascilla.

References

Unincorporated communities in Tallahatchie County, Mississippi
Unincorporated communities in Mississippi